Scoparia iwasakii is a moth in the family Crambidae. It was described by Sasaki in 1991. It is found in Japan (Honshu).

References

Moths described in 1991
Scorparia